Linthal railway station is a railway station in the municipality of Glarus Süd in the Swiss canton of Glarus. It is the terminus of the Weesen to Linthal railway line, and serves the village of Linthal.

The station is the terminus of the hourly Zürich S-Bahn service S25 from Zurich.

The station is also the terminus of a PostBus Switzerland service to Fluelen station, on the Gothard railway and Lake Lucerne, which provides several daily return journeys across the Klausen Pass between May and September. Outside that period, a minibus service called the Urnerboden Sprinter provides three connections a day to Urnerboden on the route to the pass.

References 

Linthal
Linthal